The 1928–29 season was the 20th in the history of the Isthmian League, an English football competition.

Nunhead were champions, winning their first Isthmian League title. At the end of the season Civil Service resigned from the league.

League table

References

Isthmian League seasons
I